Bakhmut Raion is a raion (district) within the northeastern part of Donetsk Oblast in eastern Ukraine. Its administrative center is Bakhmut.

Created in 1923, it was known as Artemivsk Raion from 1924 to 2016 after its administrative center, named in honor of the Soviet figure Comrade Artyom. Due to the Russo-Ukrainian War, three smaller municipalities were transferred away from Yenakiieve municipality and transferred to Bakhmut Raion (at that time Artemivsk Raion), among which are Vuhlehirsk municipality, Olkhovatka municipality, and Bulavynske municipality. On 4 February 2016, the Verkhovna Rada renamed raion to Bakhmut Raion under de-communization reforms.

On 18 July 2020, as part of the administrative reform of Ukraine, the number of raions of Donetsk Oblast was reduced to eight, of which only five were controlled by the government, and the area of Bakhmut Raion was significantly expanded.  The January 2020 estimate of the raion population was  

Within Bakhmut Raion there are six cities (Bakhmut, Chasiv Yar, Siversk, Soledar, Svitlodarsk, and Vuhlehirsk), and eight urban-type settlements.

The city is the site of an ongoing battle, the Battle of Bakhmut, as part of the Russo-Ukrainian War. 

In early 2023, a soldier was killed in Zaliznias'ke, a small unpopulated village this raion (Soledar urban hromada). (Early 2023 execution of a Ukrainian prisoner of war)

Settlements
There are some industrial factories located within the raion, namely the brick factory Stroidetal. Siversk is a former sovhoz by the name of Yamskyi. It was founded in 1913 and received city status in 1961.
 Luhanske (since 1701–1922 Piatnadtsatia Rota) is an urban-type settlement (town) with a population of 2,604. Since 1772 the town has been populated by Moldovans and Romanians. To the town's administration also includes the adjacent villages of Krasnyi Pakhar, Krynychne, Lozove, Myronivka and Rozsadky as well as the rural settlements of Roty and Skeleve.

Demographics 
As of the 2001 Ukrainian census:

Ethnicity
 Ukrainians: 78.7%
 Russians: 18.4%
 Belarusians: 0.7%
 Turks: 0.6%
 Armenians: 0.2%

See also
 Administrative divisions of Donetsk Oblast

References

External links

  Verkhovna Rada website – Administrative divisions of the Artemivsk Raion

Raions of Donetsk Oblast
 
1923 establishments in Ukraine